Glacier hiking involves walking on a glacier with special equipment, such as crampons, rope, climbing harness, helmet and ice axe, so that to some degree it resembles mountaineering.

Glaciers are found on every continent except for Australia. They need a specific climate: generally a lot of snowfall during the winter and relatively cool temperatures during the summer.    Glacier Hiking has become a tourist attraction in some countries, but it requires special knowledge of the constantly-changing environments and glacial features.  Hazards like crevasses and serac are difficult obstacles that glacier hikers should be aware of during this activity.

Locations for Glacier hiking 
All continents, with the exception of Australia, have glacier hiking destinations. Some of these destinations are easily accessible, while others are more enjoyable at certain times of the year. Each glacier hiking excursion features at least one, if not more, different paid services to help with guided tours and different sightseeing experiences.

North America

 Alaska features a variety of different glaciers that people enjoy to visit and hike. These glaciers are enjoyed especially during the summer months, as Alaska’s temperatures are always cold.
 Montana is the home to the Glacier National Park, which features over 50 glaciers on its 734 mile long trail. The trail includes other climbing and sightseeing activities as well.

South America

 Argentina is where the Perito Moreno Glacier is located. This glacier is very popular due to the fact that it is easily accessible; the glacier is 185 m above sea level. The glacier itself has remained stable since 1917.

Europe

 Switzerland has the Great Aletsch Glacier, which is located on a hiking path that includes lakes and other mountain paths. The glacier itself features 32 peaks that are 4,000 meters high.
 Iceland is home to Svínafellsjökull, a very popular glacier for hiking. It is one of the oldest and bluest glaciers in Iceland. Jökulsárlón Glacier Lagoon features the Breiðamerkurjökull glacier, which is one of the most popular ones in the country. In the winter season, it features caves that are a large tourist attraction.

Africa

 Located in Tanzania, Mount Kilimanjaro features glaciers that you can view while hiking up the mountain. These glaciers are unstable; the ice is melting and therefore, the structure is not safe to climb.

Pacific Ocean

 Although Australia has no glaciers, the neighboring nation of New Zealand does; glaciers Fox and Franz Josef are able to be hiked. The glaciers lead into a neighboring rainforest. To trek these glaciers, hikers must utilize helicopter transportation.

References

Hiking